Róbert Švehla (born January 2, 1969) is a Slovak former professional ice hockey defenceman who played in the NHL for 9 seasons from 1995 until 2003 for the Florida Panthers and Toronto Maple Leafs.

Career
Švehla was drafted 78th overall by the Calgary Flames in the 1992 NHL Entry Draft, but he did not play a game for them before moving on to the Florida Panthers.  Švehla played 8 seasons with the Panthers before moving to the Toronto Maple Leafs for his final season. Švehla played 655 career NHL games, scoring 68 goals and 267 assists for 335 points. His best offensive season was the 1995–96 season when he registered career highs in assists (49) and points (57).

Career statistics

Regular season and playoffs

International

Coaching career
On January 14, 2009, Švehla joined HC Dukla Trenčín and signed a contract as assistant coach.

References

External links
 

1969 births
Living people
Calgary Flames draft picks
Czechoslovak ice hockey defencemen
Florida Panthers players
HK Dukla Trenčín players
Ice hockey players at the 1992 Winter Olympics
Ice hockey players at the 1994 Winter Olympics
Ice hockey players at the 1998 Winter Olympics
Malmö Redhawks players
Medalists at the 1992 Winter Olympics
National Hockey League All-Stars
Olympic bronze medalists for Czechoslovakia
Olympic ice hockey players of Czechoslovakia
Olympic ice hockey players of Slovakia
Olympic medalists in ice hockey
Sportspeople from Martin, Slovakia
Slovak ice hockey coaches
Slovak ice hockey defencemen
Toronto Maple Leafs players
Slovak expatriate ice hockey players in Sweden
Slovak expatriate ice hockey players in the United States
Slovak expatriate ice hockey players in Canada